One In A Million is an American television sitcom that aired on ABC for one season in 1980. The show was developed as a starring vehicle for comedian Shirley Hemphill after the success of What's Happening!! (1976–1979) in which she played a supporting role. The show was not a success and was cancelled after just 13 episodes. The series was broadcast on Saturdays at 8 p.m Eastern time.

Overview 
The series centers around Shirley Simmons (Hemphill), a sharp-tongued taxicab driver who inherits controlling interest in the multimillion-dollar conglomerate Grayson Enterprises at the death of its founder, Jonathan Grayson, one of Shirley's regular fares. Gleefully assuming her position as CEO, she declares war on 'pompous stuffed shirts', especially company vice president Roland Cushing (Keene Curtis). She finds an ally in Nancy (Dorothy Fielding), Grayson's secretary. The series was set in Los Angeles.

The cast included several well-known character actors including Richard Paul as Mr. Grayson's nephew and Carl Ballantine as the owner of Shirley's favorite deli.

Cast 
 Shirley Hemphill as Shirley Simmons
 Richard Paul as Barton Stone
 Billy Wallace as Dennis
 Carl Ballantine as Max Kellerman
 Ralph Wilcox as Duke
 Mel Stewart as Raymond Simmons
 Keene Curtis as Mr. Cushing
 Ann Weldon as Edna Simmons
 Dorothy Fielding as Nancy Boyer

Episodes

References

External links 
 

Television series by Sony Pictures Television
American Broadcasting Company original programming
1980s American sitcoms
1980 American television series debuts
1980 American television series endings
English-language television shows
Television shows set in New York City
1980s American black sitcoms